The Ridin' Rowdy is a 1927 American silent Western film directed by Richard Thorpe and starring Jay Wilsey, Olive Hasbrouck and Harry Todd.

Cast
 Jay Wilsey as Bill Gibson 
 Olive Hasbrouck as Patricia Farris 
 Al Hart as Mose Gibson 
 Harry Todd as Deefy 
 Lafe McKee as Doc 
 Jack McCredie as Shuler
 Slim Whitaker as Miller 
 Walter Brennan
 Raye Hampton

References

Bibliography
 James Robert Parish. Hollywood character actors. Arlington House, 1978.

External links
 

1927 films
1927 Western (genre) films
1920s English-language films
American black-and-white films
Pathé Exchange films
Films directed by Richard Thorpe
Silent American Western (genre) films
1920s American films